The Bismarck-Mandan Symphony Orchestra is a community orchestra based out of Bismarck, North Dakota, and performs in the Belle Mehus Auditorium.

References

External links
Bismarck-Mandan Symphony Orchestra website

Bismarck–Mandan
Musical groups from North Dakota
American orchestras
Tourist attractions in Burleigh County, North Dakota
Performing arts in North Dakota